Choristoneura bracatana is a species of moth of the family Tortricidae. It is found on the Canary Islands.

The wingspan is 28–32 mm.

The larvae feed on Viburnum rugosum.

References

Moths described in 1894
Choristoneura